The list of shipwrecks in November 1879 includes ships sunk, foundered, grounded, or otherwise lost during November 1879.

1 November

2 November

3 November

4 November

5 November

6 November

7 November

8 November

9 November

10 November

11 November

12 November

{{shipwreck list item
|ship=G. B. S. 
|flag=
|desc=The barque capsized off Bridlington, Yorkshire. Two crew were washed off the wreck on 14 November. She was then run into by the steamship Joseph Rackett with the loss of another crew member. G. B. S. was towed in to Grimsby, Lincolnshire  by Joseph Rackett.
}}

13 November

14 November

15 November

16 November

17 November

18 November

19 November

20 November

21 November

22 November

23 November

24 November

25 November

26 November

27 November

28 November

29 November

30 November

Unknown date

References

Bibliography
Ingram, C. W. N., and Wheatley, P. O., (1936) Shipwrecks: New Zealand disasters 1795–1936.'' Dunedin, NZ: Dunedin Book Publishing Association.

1879-11
Maritime incidents in November 1879